Martian orbit may refer to:
 the orbit of Mars around the Sun
 an areocentric orbit, orbit of an object around Mars
 an areostationary orbit
 an areosynchronous orbit

See also
 Venusian orbit (disambiguation)
 Terrestrial orbit (disambiguation)